"Tonight I Wanna Be Your Man" is a song written by  Rivers Rutherford and Troy Verges, and recorded by American country music artist Andy Griggs.  It was released in January 2002 as the second single from the album Freedom.  The song reached number 7 on the Billboard Hot Country Singles & Tracks chart.

Chart performance
"Tonight I Wanna Your Man" debuted at number 51 on the U.S. Billboard Hot Country Single & Tracks for the week of February 2, 2002.

Year-end charts

References

2002 singles
Andy Griggs songs
Songs written by Rivers Rutherford
Songs written by Troy Verges
Song recordings produced by David Malloy
RCA Records Nashville singles
2002 songs